is a former Japanese football player.

Playing career
Suwazono was born in Ibusuki on March 4, 1983. After graduating from high school, he joined J1 League club FC Tokyo in 2001. Although he debuted in 2002 J.League Cup, he could hardly play in the match. In October 2002, he moved to Regional Leagues club Okinawa Kariyushi FC on loan. Although he returned to FC Tokyo in 2003, he could not play at all in the match. In June 2003, he moved to Japan Football League club Yokogawa Musashino. He played as regular player. In 2004, he moved to Regional Leagues club Volca Kagoshima. He played many matches as regular player until 2007. However he could not play at all in the match from 2008 and left the club end of 2009 season.

Club statistics

References

External links

1983 births
Living people
Association football people from Kagoshima Prefecture
Japanese footballers
J1 League players
Japan Football League players
FC Tokyo players
Tokyo Musashino United FC players
Association football midfielders